CSCD may refer to:
 Cascade and Columbia River Railroad
 Chinese Science Citation Database
 Congenital stromal corneal dystrophy